Riû is the third album released by fado singer Cuca Roseta. It was released in 2015 by Universal Music Portugal. It was produced by Nelson Motta. The album extended beyond the fado tradition and included songs written for Rosetta by Bryan Adams and Djavan. Roseta described it as "a happy album with so many positive lyrics and revealing the other face of fado, intense but hopeful".

Track listing
 Riû Riû	
 Tudo Por Tudo Our All	
 Quem Sou Who I Am	
 Amor Ladrão Thieving Love	
 Carnaval Carnival	
 Primavera Em Lisboa  Spring In Lisboa	
 Lisboa De Agora Lisboa Right Now	
 O Amor Não é Somente Amor Love Isn't Just Love	
 Verdes São Os Campos The Fields Are Green	
 Canto Do Coração The Song Of The Heart	
 Ser E Côr Being And Color	
 Tanto So Much	
 E La Chiamano Estate And They Call It Summer	
 Rua Da Oração Rua Da Oração	
 De Onde Vens Where Do You Come From	
 Ser Artista To Be An Artist

References

Cuca Roseta albums
2015 albums
Portuguese-language albums
Universal Music Group albums